is a Japanese women's professional shogi player ranked 3-dan. She is a former  title holder. She is also the first women's professional to come out of the Ladies Professional Shogi-players' Association of Japan (LSPA) and subsequently be recognized as such by the Japan Shogi Association.

Women's shogi professional
Watanabe's first appearance in a women's professional major title match came in MayJune 2018 when she challenged Kana Satomi for 29th  title, and she won the match 3 games to 1. The two met again the following year in the 30th Women's Ōi title match (MayJune 2019); Watanabe was, however, unable to successfully defend her title, losing 3 games to 1.

Watanabe met Tomoka Nishiyama in the title match of the 1st  title match in SeptemberOctober 2021, but lost the match 4 games to none.

Promotion history
Watanabe has been promoted as follows.
 3-kyū: July 3, 2012
 2-kyū: October 2013
 1-kyū: March 2014
 1-dan: March 2014
 2-dan: November 2017
 3-dan: June 2018

Note: All ranks are women's professional ranks.

Major titles and other championships
Watanabe has appeared in major title matches three times and has won one major title. In addition, she has also won two other official women's professional shogi tournaments.

Awards and honors
Watanabe received the Japan Shogi Association's "Women's Professional Award", "Women's Professional Game of the Year", "Game of the Year Special Prize" Annual Shogi Awards for the April 2018March 2019 shogi year.

In addition, to Annual Shogi Awards, Watanabe received Ōta, Tokyo's "Meritorious Resident Award" in 2019.

References

External links
 公益社団法人日本女子プロ将棋協会: 所属棋士 

 

Japanese shogi players
Living people
Women's professional shogi players
LPSA
Professional shogi players from Hokkaido
Women's Ōi
1993 births